Beyond a Dream is a live album by saxophonist Pharoah Sanders and drummer Norman Connors. It was recorded on July 22, 1978, at the Montreux Jazz Festival in Montreux, Switzerland, and was released in 1981 by Arista Novus. On the album, Sanders and Connors are joined by saxophonist and flutist Buzzy Jones, trumpeter Duke Jones, keyboardists Bobby Lyle and Billy McCoy, guitarist Greg Hill, bassist Alex Blake, conga player Lawrence Killian, and percussionist Petro Bass.

Reception

Riley Hodges of Perspective in Sound wrote: "this record has spoken to me in so many distinct, and yet non-distinct, ways. Meaning, there is a language of instruments that can be interpreted and felt, and that can give rise to many imaginative things."

Track listing

 "Babylon" (Billy McCoy) – 8:40
 "Beyond a Dream" (Kenny Cox) – 10:23
 "Montreux Overture" (Pharoah Sanders) – 4:35
 "The End of the Beginning" (Bobby Lyle) – 4:55
 "Casino Latino" (Pharoah Sanders) – 15:25

Personnel 
 Pharoah Sanders – tenor saxophone
 Norman Connors – drums, percussion
 Buzzy Jones – saxophone, flute
 Duke Jones – trumpet
 Bobby Lyle – piano
 Billy McCoy – piano, keyboards
 Greg Hill – guitar
 Alex Blake – electric bass
 Lawrence Killian – congas
 Petro Bass – percussion

References

1981 live albums
Pharoah Sanders live albums
Norman Connors albums
Arista Records live albums
Albums produced by Michael Cuscuna